Kid Rock is the sixth studio album by American musician Kid Rock, his fourth Atlantic Records album. It was released in 2003 and is his final release on Lava Records. It was critically acclaimed by Rolling Stone, which named it one of the 50 Greatest Albums of 2003. "Black Bob" and "Jackson, Mississippi" were recorded for his 1996 album Early Mornin' Stoned Pimp in 1995, but were left off the album. "Feel Like Makin' Love", "Cold and Empty", "Intro", "Hillbilly Stomp" and "Run Off to LA" were recorded for the demo sessions for 2001's Cocky, but did not make the cut as well. "Feel Like Makin' Love" originally had Sheryl Crow on the song. Country singer Kenny Chesney co-wrote "Cold and Empty".

The cover image was later reused for Rock's 2018 compilation album Greatest Hits: You Never Saw Coming.

Release and promotion 

The album's lead single was a cover of Bad Company's "Feel Like Makin' Love". It was released October 2, 2003, to radio and peaked at number 33 on the Mainstream Rock chart. The song was performed on The Tonight Show, Big In 03 Awards and the American Music Awards for its promotional push. The promotional push was capped off by the VH-1 Special A Kid Rock Christmas. He would then go on the Rock N Roll Pain Train Tour. In January 2004 he released the dark southern metal song "Jackson, Mississippi" to rock stations and the country love ballad "Cold and Empty" to AC and Pop stations. "Jackson" peaked at number 14 on the Mainstream Rock chart while "Cold and Empty" peaked at number 20 on the AC chart. The song failed to chart on either the Top 40 or Hot 100. "Cold And Empty" was used on the WB's Smallville. In July 2004 he followed the same route releasing dual singles again, releasing the acoustic ballad "I Am" to rock radio and the country ballad "Single Father", a cover of David Allan Coe, to country radio. "I Am" peaked at number 28 on the Mainstream Rock chart and was performed on the Tonight Show and Last Call. "Single Father" would become Kid Rock's second charting country song, after "Picture". It would peak at number 50. Kid Rock was criticized at Super Bowl 38 for wearing the American flag as a poncho. The incident was overshadowed by Janet Jackson and Justin Timberlake and "Nipplegate".

Track listing

Samples 

 "Rock N' Roll Pain Train" samples "Nutbush City Limits" (live version), Bob Seger (used for vocal sampling), "Everyday People" (originally performed by Sly and the Family Stone), the intro of "Talk to You Later" (originally performed by The Tubes, used for vocal sampling).
 "Cadillac Pussy" samples "Some Kind of Wonderful" (originally by Grand Funk Railroad) (backbeat)
 "Intro" samples the vocals on Run-DMC's "King of Rock" and So Whatcha Want by the Beastie Boys
 "Rock N Roll" samples Foreigner's  "Hot Blooded" and Cream's "Sunshine of Your Love"
 "Hillbilly Stomp" samples Queen's "We Will Rock You" (uses structure of song, but makes it more swamp funk-sounding) and the intro to the song is Parliament's "Little Ole Country Boy"
 "Son of Detroit" samples "Boom Boom" from John Lee Hooker and ZZ Top's "La Grange"
 "Run Off to LA" samples Stealers Wheel - Stuck In The Middle With You, samples the Rolling Stones "Dead Flowers" and the outro of the song is Iron Butterfly's "In-A-Gadda-Da-Vida"

Covers 

 "Feel Like Makin Love" by Bad Company
 "Son of Detroit", originally "Son of the South" by David Allan Coe
 "Hard Night for Sarah" by Bob Seger
 "Single Father" by David Allan Coe (although they co-wrote the song for Coe)

Credits 

 Kid Rock – vocals, acoustic guitar, lead guitar, rhythm guitar, steel guitar, slide guitar, banjo, Mellotron, dobro, percussion
 Kenny Olson – lead guitar
 Jason Krause – lead guitar, rhythm guitar, acoustic guitar
 Aaron Julison – bass guitar
 Jimmie "Bones" Trombly – piano, electric piano, keyboards, organ, Wurlitzer, harmonica, jaw harp, programming
 Stefanie Eulinberg – drums, percussion
 Lauren Creamer – background vocals
 Karen Newman – background vocals
 Thornetta Davis – background vocals
 Misty Love – background vocals
 Shirley Hayden – background vocals
 Hank Williams Jr. – vocals on "Cadillac Pussy"
 Johnny Evans – saxophone on "Cadillac Pussy"
 Kenny Wayne Shepherd – lead guitar on "Black Bob"
 David McMurray – saxophone (tenor) on "Black Bob"
 Larry Nozero – saxophone (baritone) on "Black Bob"
 Raye Biggs – trumpet on "Black Bob"
 Billy Gibbons – vocals on "Hillbilly Stomp"
 Sheryl Crow – vocals on "Run Off to LA"
 Bob Ebeling – drums on "Jackson, Mississippi"

Charts

Weekly charts

Year-end charts

Certifications

References

External links 

 Official website

Kid Rock albums
2003 albums
Atlantic Records albums
Lava Records albums
Hard rock albums by American artists
Southern rock albums
Country rock albums